Albert, Prince of Schwarzburg-Rudolstadt (30 April 1798 – 26 November 1869) was a sovereign prince of Schwarzburg-Rudolstadt.

Biography
He was born in Rudolstadt the second son of the reigning prince of Schwarzburg-Rudolstadt, Louis Frederick II and his wife Landgravine Caroline of Hesse-Homburg (1771–1854). His father died on 28 April 1807, and his brother Friedrich Günther (* 1793) succeeded him as sovereign prince with Albert becoming the heir presumptive. Landgravine Caroline acted as regent for Albert's brother Friedrich Günther until he came of age in 1814. As a Prussian Lieutenant, the 16 years old Albert participated 1814 and 1815 as member of the staff of Louis William, Landgrave of Hesse-Homburg, his uncle, in the Prussian campaign against Napoleon Bonaparte. Serving in the Prussian army, he married 1827 Auguste zu Solms-Braunfels, a niece of the Prussian king. 
 
Following the death of his brother Friedrich Günther on 28 June 1867, Albert succeeded his brother as reigning prince instead of his nephew Prince Sizzo of Leutenberg, who was born as a result of a morganatic marriage. His short two-year reign came to an end following his death in Rudolstadt. He was succeeded by his son Hereditary Prince Georg.

Marriage and children
On 26 July 1827, Prince Albert was married to Princess Augusta Luise of Solms-Braunfels (25 July 1804 – 8 October 1865), daughter of Duchess Frederica of Mecklenburg-Strelitz and Prince Frederick William of Solms-Braunfels and niece of the Prussian king Friedrich Wilhelm III. . They had four children.
 Prince Karl Günther (1828-1828)
 Princess Elisabeth (1833–1896) married Leopold III, Prince of Lippe
 Prince Georg (1838–1890)
 Prince Ernst Heinrich (1848-1848)

References

External links

1798 births
1869 deaths
German princes
House of Schwarzburg
Generals of Cavalry (Prussia)